CH Barcelona-Catalonia was an ice hockey team in Barcelona, Catalonia, Spain. They played in the Superliga Espanola de Hockey Hielo from 1975-77.

History
This team was founded in 1975 as the farm team of FC Barcelona Ice Hockey. The team lasted two years in the Superliga Espanola de Hockey Hielo, before folding in 1977.

Results
1976 - ?
1977 - 6th place

Ice hockey teams in Catalonia
Sport in Barcelona
1975 establishments in Spain
1977 disestablishments in Spain
Defunct ice hockey teams in Europe
Ice hockey clubs established in 1975
Ice hockey clubs disestablished in 1977